Muddy Fork may refer to:

Muddy Fork (North Fork Salt River), a stream in Missouri
Muddy Fork (Oregon), a stream in Oregon